Following is a list of Bantu languages as interpreted by Harald Hammarström, and following the Guthrie classification.

See also
Bantu languages
Guthrie classification of Bantu languages
Classification of Pygmy languages
List of endangered languages in Africa

References

External links
Guthrie's 1948 classification, in detail, with each language numbered
Maho 2009. Guthrie 1971, in detail, with subsequent additions, corrections, and corresponding ISO codes as of Ethnologue 15. Coding conventions are explained in Nurse & Philippson (2003). They are (with invented examples):
A capital letter is added for an additional dialect of an existing language. That is, A15C would be a dialect of language A15 in addition to Guthrie's dialects A15a and A15b.
A third digit is added for an additional language. If its closest relative can be identified, the digit is added to that code. That is, A151 would be a non-Guthrie language closest to Guthrie's A15.
If a close relative has not been identified, the digit is added to the decade code. That is, A101 would be a language geographically in group A10, but not particularly close to any of Guthrie's A10 languages, or not known well enough to further classify.
Pidgins and creoles are indicated by adding a capital letter to the decade code. That is, A10A would be a pidgin or creole based on a language in group A10.

 
Classification of African languages
Bantu